The UK Singles Chart is one of many music charts compiled by the Official Charts Company that calculates the best-selling singles of the week in the United Kingdom. Since 2004 the chart has been based on the sales of both physical singles and digital downloads, with airplay figures excluded from the official chart. This list shows singles that peaked in the Top 10 of the UK Singles Chart during 2013, as well as singles which peaked in 2012 and 2014 but were in the top 10 in 2013. The entry date is when the single appeared in the top 10 for the first time (week ending, as published by the Official Charts Company, which is six days after the chart is announced).

One-hundred and fifty-two singles were in the top ten in 2013. Ten singles from 2012 remained in the top 10 for several weeks at the beginning of the year, "Happy" by Pharrell Williams and "Trumpets" by Jason Derulo were released in 2013 but did not reach their peak until 2014. "Scream & Shout" by Britney Spears & will.i.am and "I Knew You Were Trouble" by Taylor Swift were the singles from 2012 to reach their peak in 2013. Forty-seven artists scored multiple entries in the top 10 in 2013. Bastille, John Newman, Macklemore & Ryan Lewis, Union J and The Vamps were among the many artists who achieved their first UK charting top 10 single in 2013.

"Impossible" by British singer-songwriter and X Factor series 9 winner James Arthur returned to number-one for the first two weeks of 2013, giving the single a total of three weeks on top of the chart. It had vacated the top spot for one week as The Justice Collective secured the 2012 Christmas number-one with "He Ain't Heavy, He's My Brother", a charity single in aid of the Hillsborough Disaster. The first new number-one single of the year was "Scream & Shout" by American singers Britney Spears & will.i.am. Overall, thirty different singles peaked at number-one in 2013, with Avicii, Miley Cyrus and Pharrell Williams (2) having the joint most singles hit that position.

Background

Multiple entries
One-hundred and fifty-two singles charted in the top 10 in 2013, with one-hundred and forty singles reaching their peak this year.

Forty-seven artists scored multiple entries in the top 10 in 2013. Scottish DJ and producer Calvin Harris had the most top ten singles in 2013 with five. "Under Control" featuring Alesso and Hurts was at number-one for a week and remained in the top ten for one more week. Other entries included "Thinking About You" featuring Ayah Marar (number 8), "I Need Your Love" featuring Ellie Goulding (4), "Drinking from the Bottle" featuring Tinie Tempah (5) and a remix of Fatboy Slim's "Eat, Sleep, Rave, Repeat which reached number 3. Boyband One Direction, Swedish DJ Avicii, rappers Dizzee Rascal and Eminem and will.i.am from the Black Eyed Peas all had four top ten singles in 2013.

Chart debuts
Sixty-five artists achieved their first top 10 single in 2013, either as a lead or featured artist. Of these, five went on to record another hit single that year: Bastille, Breach, Demi Lovato, Disclosure and Union J. 2 Chainz and Macklemore & Ryan Lewis had two other entries in their breakthrough year.

The following table (collapsed on desktop site) does not include acts who had previously charted as part of a group and secured their first top 10 solo single. 

Notes
Nate Ruess made his chart debut with his band Fun in 2012 with the song "We Are Young" but he had his first individual credit in 2013 featuring on Pink's "Just Give Me a Reason.
Sebastian Ingrosso had previous hit singles in the supergroup Swedish House Mafia ("One (Your Name)", "Miami 2 Ibiza", "Save the World", "Antidote" and "Don't You Worry Child") but "Reload" was his first top 10 in his own right.

Selena Gomez made her chart debut with her band Selena Gomez & the Scene in 2010 with the song "Naturally" but "Come & Get It" was her first solo top 10 single. Although "We Can't Stop" was Miley Cyrus's first official top 10 single, she was part of the Helping Haiti charity single "Everybody Hurts" in 2010, which reached number-one.

Songs from films
Original songs from various films entered the top 10 throughout the year. These included "We Own It (Fast & Furious) (from Fast & Furious 6), "Bang Bang" (The Great Gatsby), "Ding-Dong! The Witch Is Dead" (The Wizard of Oz), "We Own the Night" (The Wolverine) and "Happy" (Despicable Me 2).

Charity singles
A number of singles recorded for charity reached the top 10 in the charts in 2013.

Best-selling singles
Robin Thicke featuring T.I. and Pharrell Williams had the best-selling single of the year with "Blurred Lines". The song spent fourteen weeks in the top 10 (including five weeks at number one), sold over 1.472 million copies and was certified 3× platinum by the BPI (December 2015). "Get Lucky" by Daft Punk featuring Pharrell Williams & Nile Rodgers came in second place, selling more than 1.308 million copies and losing out by around 164,000 sales. Avicii featuring Aloe Blacc's "Wake Me Up", "Let Her Go" from Passenger, and "La La La" by Naughty Boy featuring Sam Smith made up the top five. Singles by Katy Perry, Macklemore & Ryan Lewis featuring Wanz, Pink featuring Nate Ruess, OneRepublic and Justin Timberlake were also in the top ten best-selling singles of the year.

Top-ten singles
Key

Entries by artist

The following table shows artists who achieved two or more top 10 entries in 2013, including singles that reached their peak in 2012 or 2014. The figures include both main artists and featured artists, while appearances on ensemble charity records are also counted for each artist. The total number of weeks an artist spent in the top ten in 2013 is also shown.

Notes

 "Stay" and "Don't You Worry Child" re-entered the top 10 at number seven and number nine respectively on 12 January 2013 (week ending).
 "I Knew You Were Trouble" re-entered the top 10 at number six on 2 March 2013 (week ending).
 "White Noise" re-entered the top 10 at number 10 on 23 March 2013 (week ending).
 "Let's Get Ready to Rhumble" re-entered the top 10 at number one on 6 April 2013 (week ending) following a performance by Ant and Dec on Ant and Dec's Saturday Night Takeaway; the single originally peaked at number 9 in 1994.
 "Heart Attack" re-entered the top 10 at number ten on 8 June 2013 (week ending).
 "Get Lucky" re-entered the top 10 at number nine on 3 August 2013 (week ending).
 "Skyscraper" was originally released in 2012, but entered the top 10 at number seven on 12 October 2013 (week ending).
 "Hold On, We're Going Home" re-entered the top 10 at number ten on 2 November 2013 (week ending).
 "Do What U Want" re-entered the top 10 at number ten on 14 December 2013 (week ending).
 "Roar" and "Counting Stars" re-entered the top 10 at number eight and number ten respectively on 4 January 2014 (week ending).
 "Animals" re-entered the top 10 at number eight on 11 January 2014 (week ending).
 "Ding-Dong! The Witch Is Dead" entered the chart following the death of Margaret Thatcher as a protest against her politics when she was Prime Minister.
 Released as the official single for Comic Relief.
 Released as the official single for Children in Need.
 Figure includes appearance on Jessie J's "Wild".
 Figure includes appearance on 50 Cent's "My Life".
 Figure includes appearance on Dizzee Rascal's "Goin' Crazy".
 Figure includes single that peaked in 2012.
 Figure includes single that peaked in 2014.
 Released to support the families affected by the Hillsborough disaster.
 Figure includes an appearance on the Justice Collective charity single "He Ain't Heavy, He's My Brother".
 Figure includes appearance on Dizzee Rascal's "Something Really Bad".
 Figure includes appearances on Jason Derulo's "Talk Dirty" and Tinie Tempah's "Trampoline".
 Figure includes two top 10 singles with the group Lawson.
 Figure includes appearance on Calvin Harris' "I Need Your Love".
 Figure includes appearances on Labrinth's "Beneath Your Beautiful" and Naughty Boy's "Lifted".
 Figure includes appearances on Tinie Tempah's "Children of the Sun", Swedish House Maffia's "Don't You Worry Child", and Sebastian Ingrosso and Tommy Trash's "Reload".
 Figure includes appearance on Jay-Z's "Holy Grail".
 Figure includes appearance on Robin Thicke's "Blurred Lines".
 Figure includes appearance on Eminem's "The Monster".
 Figure includes appearance on Tinie Tempah's "Drinking from the Bottle".
 Figure includes appearance on Conor Maynard's "Animal".
 Figure includes appearance on Disclosure's "You & Me".
 Figure includes appearance on Justin Timberlake's "Suit & Tie".
 Figure includes appearance on The Saturdays' "What About Us".
 Figure includes one top 10 single with the group Swedish House Maffia.
 Figure includes appearance on Daft Punk's "Get Lucky".
 Figure includes appearance on Iggy Azalea's "Change Your Life".
 Figure includes single that first charted in 2012 but peaked in 2013.

See also
2013 in British music
List of number-one singles from the 2010s (UK)

References
General

Specific

External links
2013 singles chart archive at the Official Charts Company (click on relevant week)

United Kingdom
Top 10 singles
2013